Lewis Holland (born 14 January 1993) is a professional rugby union player who represents Australia in rugby sevens. Born in Queanbeyan, New South Wales and playing for Queanbeyan Whites at a club level, he debuted for Australia in February 2011. As of December 2015, he had 28 caps.

Rugby career
Holland made his debut in 2011. He represented both his state and country in 2010 while attending St Edmund's College, Canberra. Holland played Australian Schoolboys alongside former 7s teammate Tom Cusack. In 2012, Holland and Cusack reunited in Australian colours again at the IRB Junior World Championship. Representative Honours include Australian Schoolboys (2010), Australian Under 20s (2012) and the Rugby World Cup in 2013, where he scored a try.

Holland competed at the 2016 Summer Olympics.

Holland was a member of the Australian men's rugby seven's squad at the Tokyo 2020 Olympics. The team came third in their pool round and then lost to Fiji 19-nil in the quarterfinal. Full details.

Rebels
As a result of the COVID-19 pandemic, Holland signed-on to play for Super Rugby team Melbourne Rebels during the temporary 2020 Super Rugby AU season.

Super Rugby statistics

References

External links
 
 
 
 
 
 

1993 births
Australian rugby union players
Male rugby sevens players
Australia international rugby sevens players
Living people
Rugby sevens players at the 2016 Summer Olympics
Olympic rugby sevens players of Australia
Melbourne Rebels players
Rugby union fly-halves
Rugby union centres
Rugby sevens players at the 2020 Summer Olympics